McDonalds Mill is an unincorporated community in the northeastern section of Montgomery County, Virginia. Located approximately 10 miles east of Blacksburg, Virginia along State Route 785, McDonalds Mill lies at the floor of the Catawba Valley and is bound on the south by Paris Mountain and to the north by Gallion Ridge.

History
A post office called McDonalds Mills operated from 1847 until 1913. George McDonald operated a mill there, hence the name.

References

Unincorporated communities in Montgomery County, Virginia
Unincorporated communities in Virginia